Schwalbe Tires is a brand name of Ralf Bohle GmbH, a German manufacturer of pneumatic tires for bicycles and wheelchairs. Schwalbe produces a wide range of tires for different cycling applications, but is best known for its commuting, touring and utility tires such as the Marathon range. Schwalbe also makes and markets tires for a variety of small wheel sizes, such as used on folding, BMX, children's, and recumbent bicycles, and on bicycle trailers, a market ignored by some larger manufacturers.

Schwalbe Tires is based in Reichshof- near Cologne, Germany, as of 2018 through 2021. Manufacturing is carried out in their Indonesian factory, which is co-owned with its Korean joint-venture, production partner, PT Hung-A, and in its Vietnamese factory.

References

External links

Main international website

Cycle parts manufacturers
Tire manufacturers of Germany
German brands